Protocadherin alpha-C2 is a protein that in humans is encoded by the PCDHAC2 gene.

This gene is a member of the protocadherin alpha gene cluster, one of three related gene clusters tandemly linked on chromosome five that demonstrate an unusual genomic organization similar to that of B-cell and T-cell receptor gene clusters. The alpha gene cluster is composed of 15 cadherin superfamily genes related to the mouse CNR genes and consists of 13 highly similar and 2 more distantly related coding sequences. The tandem array of 15 N-terminal exons, or variable exons, are followed by downstream C-terminal exons, or constant exons, which are shared by all genes in the cluster. The large, uninterrupted N-terminal exons each encode six cadherin ectodomains while the C-terminal exons encode the cytoplasmic domain. These neural cadherin-like cell adhesion proteins are integral plasma membrane proteins that most likely play a critical role in the establishment and function of specific cell-cell connections in the brain. Alternative splicing has been observed and additional variants have been suggested but their full-length nature has yet to be determined.

References

Further reading